The Big Ten women's soccer tournament is the conference championship tournament in soccer for the Big Ten Conference. The tournament is single-elimination format and seeding is based on regular season records. The top four highest-seeded teams host the quarterfinal matches and the highest remaining seed after the quarterfinal round. The highest remaining seeded teams following the quarterfinal round hosts the semifinals and likewise for the championship match.

The winner, declared conference champion, receives the conference's automatic bid to the NCAA Division I women's soccer championship.

Champions

Key

Finals

Performance by school

Most championships

Records all-time by team
through 2022 Tournament

Big Ten Medal of Honor
The Big Ten Medal of Honor is awarded to a player from the graduating class of a Big Ten Conference university who "demonstrated athletic and academic excellence throughout their college career." The recipients include:

Notes

References

External links
 Big Ten Conference Tournament Archives

 
NCAA Division I women's soccer conference tournaments